Ravneet Ricky (born 17 October 1980) is an Indian cricketer. He played 73 first-class and 40 List A matches between 1997 and 2008. He was also part of India's squad for the 2000 Under-19 Cricket World Cup.

References

External links
 

1980 births
Living people
Indian cricketers
Punjab, India cricketers
Cricketers from Amritsar